Alban Berg's Five Orchestral Songs after Postcards by Peter Altenberg (German: Fünf Orchesterlieder nach Ansichtskarten von Peter Altenberg), Op. 4, were composed in 1911 and 1912 for medium voice, or mezzo-soprano. They are considered a true song cycle, unlike his previous two groups of songs, the Sieben frühe Lieder of 1908 and the Vier Gesänge, Op. 2, of 1910, and they are his first work for orchestra. The postcard texts by contemporary Viennese poet Peter Altenberg recount the stormy but beautiful condition of the soul and the palpable sensations of love and longing. The highly imaginative music responds with many displaced ostinati and a conflicted, lyrical passion.

When two of the songs (Numbers 2 and 3) were performed for the first time – on 31 March 1913 under the baton of Berg's teacher Schönberg in Vienna's Musikverein – members of the audience were sufficiently taken aback as to erupt in a famous riot, wounding the composer's feelings so deeply that he never again sought a performance for them.

Structure
The songs are:
 (Soul, how much more beautiful are you)
 (Did you see the forest after the rainstorm?)
 (Beyond the boundaries of the universe)
 (Nothing has come)
 (Here is peace)

Instrumentation
The work is scored for medium voice (mezzo-soprano) and a large orchestra consisting of:

Woodwinds
3 flutes (3rd doubling piccolo)
3 oboes (3rd doubling English horn)
3 clarinets in B (3rd doubling clarinet in E)
1 bass clarinet in B
3 bassoons (3rd doubling contrabassoon)

Brass
4 horns in F
3 trumpets in F
4 trombones (1st doubling alto trombone)
1 tuba (doubling contrabass tuba)

Percussion
timpani
4 players playing glockenspiel, xylophone, triangle, cymbals, tam-tam, side drum, and bass drum

Keyboard
2 players sharing celesta, piano and harmonium

Strings
violins I, II
violas
celli
double basses
harp

References

External links

Compositions by Alban Berg
1912 compositions
Lieder
Compositions for symphony orchestra
Music riots
Music controversies